Live Earth was a one-off event developed to combat climate change. The first series of benefit concerts  were held on July 7, 2007. The concerts brought together more than 150 musical acts in twelve locations around the world which were broadcast to a mass global audience through televisions, radio, and streamed via the Internet. It was "unclear" where ticket proceeds from ticket sales went towards.

Overview

The umbrella organization for the event was Save Our Selves, founded by Kevin Wall (Executive Producer), and included major partners such as former U.S. Vice President Al Gore, the Alliance for Climate Protection, Earthlab, MSN, and Control Room, the production company which produced the event. The logo for the event was the Morse code distress signal. Brand Neutral, the environmental business strategy firm, served as the worldwide sustainability strategy and services partner for Live Earth, developing the overall sustainability strategy, staffing all members of the global "green team," creating the overall master plan for resource management, and supervising the execution of the Live Earth environmental strategy. Leading sustainability expert John Picard served as chief environmental and efficiency counsellor for the event. 

The worldwide producer of talent and venue programming for all of the events was Aaron Grosky. The worldwide producer of events was Lily Sobhani. Live Earth produced 60 short films, directed by leading filmmakers from the worlds of films, music videos, commercials and animation. The worldwide producer of Live Earth films was Kit Hawkins. The 22-hour global TV broadcast (world feed) and satellite distribution, as well as radio, internet and mobile production was overseen by Executive in Charge of Production André Mika and produced and directed by Paul Flattery. Ryan Polito also directed the worldwide feed. Unlike the similar Live 8 concerts, which were free, Live Earth charged admission but the event was made broadly available via television and the Internet.

The 2007 event set a new record for on-line entertainment with over 15 million video streams during the live concert alone. Television ratings were mixed, with 41% of households in Canada watching the concerts, while figures in the UK were characterized as a "flop". Television ratings in the United States were "dismal" as well; NBC's broadcast of Live Earth was the least watched network program between the Big Four Television Networks. On the other hand, Bravo, an NBC Universal property, reported the highest Saturday ratings in the network's history. Live Earth also performed very well on television ratings in Brazil, reaching 37% of households via Rede Globo, and in Germany, reaching 20% of households through the N24 broadcast.

Background
The plans for the Live Earth concerts were announced at a media event in Los Angeles on 15 February 2007 by Al Gore, Kevin Wall and other celebrities.<ref>Lee, Ken. (15 February 2007) "Al Gore, Cameron Diaz Announce Environmental Campaign." People.com. Retrieved on: 2 August 2007.</ref> The inspiration for promoting the cause using benefit concerts comes from many similar events over the past 25 years including the 1985 Live Aid concerts and the 2005 Live 8 concerts and it was to be the longest show ever to be recorded in the world records. The event was claimed to be carbon neutral, and organisers said they would purchase carbon credits to offset the environmental impact of the flights associated with the events.

In addition to raising awareness of global warming, on 28 June 2007, it was revealed that Live Earth was to be the launch event for the Live Earth Call to Action. During the concerts people were asked to support the following 7-point pledge:

To demand that my country join an international treaty within the next 2 years that cuts global warming pollution by 90% in developed countries and by more than half worldwide in time for the next generation to inherit a healthy earth;
To take personal action to help solve the climate crisis by reducing my own CO2 pollution as much as I can and offsetting the rest to become 'carbon neutral;'
To fight for a moratorium on the construction of any new generating facility that burns coal without the capacity to safely trap and store the CO2;
To work for a dramatic increase in the energy efficiency of my home, workplace, school, place of worship, and means of transportation;
To fight for laws and policies that expand the use of renewable energy sources and reduce dependence on oil and coal;
To plant new trees and to join with others in preserving and protecting forests; and,
To buy from businesses and support leaders who share my commitment to solving the climate crisis and building a sustainable, just, and prosperous world for the 21st century.

In subsequent interviews Al Gore indicated that the concerts would mark 'the beginning of a three-year campaign worldwide to deliver information about how we solve the climate crisis'Moving Beyond Kyoto, New York Times, published 2007-07-01, accessed 2007-07-03 and that 'the prospects for every future generation depend on us understanding, hearing and acting upon this information.'

Live Earth's supporters included climate change activists in New Zealand's Climaction Coalition, who praised concert organisers, stating "Climate change is the greatest threat facing humanity today."  Climaction spokesperson David Colyer said the concert presented "a great opportunity to join our voices with theirs" and called on people who could not attend a concert to participate in local events to raise awareness about climate change.

Further information on the issues raised by the concerts are published in The Live Earth Global Warming Survival Handbook, written by environmentalist David Mayer de Rothschild.Rodale Books to publish the official Live Earth Global Warming Survival Handbook, Live Earth, published 2006-05-16 Profits from the book will be donated to the Alliance for Climate Protection, as will some of the profits from the concerts.

Antecedents for the style of concerts

The concert series followed in the tradition of many benefit events staged in the past three decades:

The aspect of multiple concerts on a single day followed two events conceived by Bob Geldof—two Live Aid concerts staged on July 13, 1985, and eight Live 8 concerts staged on July 2, 2005.
The aspect of a series of rock concerts for a single cause taking place in multiple nations across the planet echoed the twenty concerts presented in 1988 on Amnesty International's Human Rights Now! World Tour - a tour conceived by Jack Healey and Martin Lewis.

The deployment of multiple pop and rock musicians and entertainers to promote awareness of a single cause has many antecedents - the principal examples being:

Two 1971 Concerts for Bangladesh - conceived by George Harrison and Ravi Shankar
Amnesty International's Secret Policeman's Balls benefit shows staged from 1976 to 1981 - conceived by John Cleese and Martin Lewis
Four 1979 No Nukes concerts - conceived by Jackson Browne, Graham Nash, Bonnie Raitt and John Hall
Four 1979 Concerts for Kampuchea - conceived by Paul McCartney and Kurt Waldheim

Friends of Live Earth
 Live Earth Alert, was a Netherlands contribution/concept, to the real program Live Earth on 07/07/07. In Westerpark in Amsterdam (NL) a parallel event had been organised which included a continuous 24-hour live broadcast program on Nederland 3 of live streams (in sequential order) from Live Earth events and reports from Dutch correspondents stationed on all 7 continents as well as an almost 12 hour side event at the home location with performances, artists and other side activities. Some parts of this Dutch program were included in the official Live Earth streams and broadcast worldwide.
 Korean Broadcasting System (KBS) in South Korea broadcast a special TV program named "Save The Earth - A Friend Of Live Earth", a live event of special presentations, performances, and concerts of the K-pop stars.

Locations
The organizers intended to present concerts on all seven continents. They stated that the venues would use on-site power generation, efficient methods of energy utilisation and sustainable facilities management in an effort to minimise environmental impact.

The South African concert, originally scheduled for the Cradle of Mankind, was abandoned by local promoter Big Concerts, due to poor ticket sales statistics, believed to be a result of the non-central nature of this landmark and poor planning by the promoter. The Coca-Cola Dome was settled on two days prior to the concert starting.

Washington D.C. venue
It was only hours before the Washington D.C. concert was scheduled to begin that organisers were able to secure a venue for the last-minute addition to the schedule. The Washington Post reported the U.S. capital had been Gore's first choice for the main concert. However, the main concert was moved to New Jersey and Gore made a surprise announcement during a 6 July media interview that a concert would take place on the plaza of the Museum of the American Indian. "Some who don't understand what is now at stake tried to stop this event on the Mall, but here we are. [crowd is cheering] And it wasn't the cavalry who came to our rescue, it was the American Indians," Gore said during brief opening remarks carried live on the MSN website.

Performers

Wembley Stadium (United Kingdom)

SOS Allstars (led by Roger Taylor, Chad Smith, and Taylor Hawkins)
Genesis
Razorlight
Snow Patrol
Damien Rice & David Gray
Kasabian
Paolo Nutini
The Black Eyed Peas
John Legend
Duran Duran
Red Hot Chili Peppers
Bloc Party
Corinne Bailey Rae
Terra Naomi
Keane
Metallica
Spinal Tap
James Blunt
Beastie Boys
The Pussycat Dolls
Foo Fighters
Madonna with Eugene Hütz & Sergey Ryabtsev

Presenters:
Alan Carr
Boris Becker
Chris Moyles
Chris Rock
David Tennant
Eddie Izzard
Gerard Butler
Geri Halliwell
Ioan Gruffudd
June Sarpong
Kevin Wall
Kyle MacLachlan
Neve Campbell
Ricky Gervais
Rob Reiner
Russell Brand
Terence Stamp
Thandie Newton

Giants Stadium (East Rutherford, New Jersey, United States)

Kenna
KT Tunstall
Taking Back Sunday
Keith Urban with special guest Alicia Keys
Ludacris
AFI
Fall Out Boy
Akon
John Mayer
Melissa Etheridge
Alicia Keys
Dave Matthews Band
Kelly Clarkson
Kanye West
Bon Jovi
The Smashing Pumpkins	
Roger Waters	
The Police with special guests John Mayer and Kanye West

Presenters:
Al Gore
Cameron Diaz
Dhani Jones
Jane Goodall
Kevin Bacon
Leonardo DiCaprio
Petra Nemcova
Rachel Weisz
Randy Jackson
Robert Kennedy Jr.
Rosario Dawson
Tipper Gore

National Mall (United States)

Blues Nation
Garth Brooks
Native Roots
Yarina
Trisha Yearwood
Presenters:
Al Gore

Sydney Football Stadium (Australia)

Blue King Brown
Toni Collette & the Finish
Sneaky Sound System
Ghostwriters
Paul Kelly
Eskimo Joe
Missy Higgins
The John Butler Trio
Wolfmother
Jack Johnson
Crowded House

Presenters:
Bruce McAvaney
Jimmy Barnes
Hamish & Andy
Tim Ross
Richard Wilkins
Ian Thorpe

Coca-Cola Dome (South Africa)

South African Drum Cafe Team
Danny K
Angélique Kidjo
Baaba Maal
Vusi Mahlasela
The Parlotones
The Soweto Gospel Choir
Joss Stone
UB40
Zola
Presenters:
Naomi Campbell
DJ Suga

Makuhari Messe (Japan)

Tu Vieja
Rize
Ayaka
Ai Otsuka
Ai
Xzibit
Abingdon Boys School
Cocco
Linkin Park
Kumi Koda
Rihanna

Presenters:
Ken Watanabe
Kazutoshi Sakurai

Tō-ji (Japan)

Rip Slyme
UA
Bonnie Pink
Michael Nyman
Yellow Magic Orchestra

HSH Nordbank Arena (Germany)

Shakira with Gustavo Cerati
Snoop Dogg
Roger Cicero
MIA.
Sasha
Stefan Gwildis
Marquess
Maria Mena
Silbermond
Michael Mittermeier
Chris Cornell
Enrique Iglesias
Jan Delay
Juli
Katie Melua
Lotto King Karl
Mando Diao
Reamonn with Ritmo Del Mundo
Revolverheld
Samy Deluxe
Yusuf Islam aka Cat Stevens

Presenters:
Katarina Witt
Nova Meierhenrich
Holger Ponick
Andreas Kuhlage
Elton
Tim Mälzer
Oli P.
Gülcan Karahancı
Michael Mittermeier
Simon Gosejohann
Eberhard Brandes (WWF Germany)
Charlotte Engelhardt

Copacabana Beach (Brazil)

DJ Dennis
Xuxa
Jota Quest
MC Perlla
MV Bill
Marcelo D2
Pharrell
O Rappa
Macy Gray
Jorge Ben Jor
Lenny Kravitz
Banda Zambe
DJ Janet

Oriental Pearl Tower (China)

Evonne Hsu
Anthony Wong
Soler
Huang Xiao Ming
Douglas Vale
12 Girls Band
Joey Yung
Winnie Hsin
Sarah Brightman
Wang Xiao Kun
Eason Chan
Wang Chuang Jun
Wang Rui
Pu Ba Jia

Basilica of St. John Lateran (Rome, Italy)

The London Oratory School Schola
 The Rome Philharmonic Orchestra
 Michael D'Alessandra
 Christiano Serino
The Bernini Quartet

Rothera Research Station (Antarctica)

Nunatak

Audience
The concerts were broadcast in over 130 countries by more than 500 media partners including television, radio, Internet and wireless channels. National television viewing figures included 19 million viewers in the US, 41% of all households in Canada, 37% of all households in Brazil, and 20% in Germany.

The event also attracted a record on-line audience. Live coverage attracted over 8 million people who watched over 15 million video streams, while total 55 million video streams had been watched by 23 July.

United Kingdom
London's Wembley Stadium production of "Live Earth," received poor viewing figures on the BBC, blamed on a good weather Saturday afternoon, in addition to the network's tennis coverage at Wimbledon. BBC's live afternoon coverage of the concert drew an average of about 900,000 viewers while the evening viewing figures averaged around 3.1 million and the highlight figures, near the end of the concert, were around 4.5 million. Three times as many viewers had watched the Concert for Diana six days earlier and 9.6 million viewers had watched the Live 8 concert, two years earlier.

Controversies and criticism
While garnering favorable comments, several aspects of the event drew criticism from various perspectives.

Republican Political Criticism
Some Republicans criticized Al Gore for organising the event and said he did so to promote himself for a 2008 U.S. presidential election bid, although Gore has said repeatedly he is "not planning to be a candidate again for office"
and has said that he "had fallen out of love with politics."
Gore did not declare himself as a candidate for any of the 2008 presidential primaries.

Environmental impact
Bands including The Who, Muse  and Arctic Monkeys dubbed Live Earth "Private Jets for Climate Change." The event's total carbon footprint, including the artists' and spectators' travel and energy consumption, was probably at least 74,500 tonnes, according to John Buckley of CarbonFootPrint.com - more than 3,000 times the average Briton's annual footprint.  An estimate reported that 100,000 planted trees are required to offset total carbon emissions produced during the entire event, as well as a key sponsor for the event being Chevrolet, promoting a new hybrid four-wheel drive.

The BBC cancelled a later major attempt to "raise consciousness" of global climate change. The BBC's news story suggested that this was in part because "poor ratings in the UK and elsewhere for July's Live Earth concert may have confirmed the internal belief that the public do not like being "lectured to" on climate change."

DaimlerChrysler used its low-emissions Smart car brand while sponsoring the event worldwide.

Concert-goers at the event’s London leg had left thousands of plastic cups on the floor of Wembley Stadium, although organisers had urged audience members to use the recycling bins provided, the BBC reported.

Al Gore was unhappy with the travel arrangements of the UK band Razorlight. After their appearance at the London Live Earth event, they were ferried to an airport in a large tour bus with a police escort to catch a private jet to Scotland. From the airport in Scotland they travelled by helicopter to Balado to perform at T in the Park. Razorlight claimed they would offset their emissions by planting trees.

Singer-songwriter John Mayer, one of the big attractions at the New Jersey/New York concert had not signed Gore's seven-point Live Earth pledge. "If you want to peg me as not being entirely eco-friendly, you'll win," Mayer told reporters after his set. "We're just getting together saying 'We want to be healthier'.”

Bob Geldof and Live 8
Before the goals of the concerts were announced on June 28, the concert was criticised by Live Aid organiser Bob Geldof and Roger Daltrey of The Who about a lack of a final goal. Geldof said in an interview on 15 May 2007, that the concerts are a waste of time because "Everybody's known about global warming for years." Geldof said he would organise a concert like Live Earth only if he "could go on stage and announce concrete environmental measures from the American presidential candidates, Congress, or major corporations."

A spokesman for Live Earth responded to Geldof, saying that the concerts were intended to raise awareness about the dangers of climate change. "People are aware of global warming but millions are not doing anything about changing their lifestyles."

BBC coverage of the London venue
The BBC, which televised the concert in the United Kingdom, received a total of 413 complaints because coverage of Metallica's live set was cut short, and approximately 130 complaints concerning swearing as the BBC had shown the concert before the watershed time of 9pm, this includes Chris Rock jokingly calling the crowd "motherfuckers". The BBC later apologised for cutting away from footage of Metallica, and both during and after the concert for the bad language. On 12 April 2008, an Ofcom broadcast was shown on BBC1, apologising again for the 'offensive language.'

Financial lack of transparency
Intelligent Giving have attempted to find out what was happening to the proceeds from ticket sales at the concerts. Their conclusions, published in a feature "What on (Live) Earth is going on?" were that no one involved is capable of giving a clear answer.

Home release

Live Earth was documented on Live Earth: The Concerts for a Climate in Crisis'', released on November 26 internationally and December 4 in the U.S (DVD 780.97 L) by Warner Bros. Records. Featuring one CD and two DVDs, the set featured footage from the London, New York and Tokyo concerts, six of the short films from the project, and a making of documentary of the concerts. Proceeds from the CD/DVD were directed to the Alliance for Climate Protection.

Track list

CD

DVD 1

DVD 2

See also
Live Earth

References

External links

Official Site (Archived)
Live Earth online broadcast
Live Earth Blog
BBC's Live Earth website
NBC's Live Earth website
Live Earth Carbon Calculator
CTV's Live Earth website with Much Music

Live Earth Final Assessment Report
liveearth.visiblestrategies.com
Green Guidelines First edition final (PDF)

2007
2007 in music
2007 in the environment